Ulochaetes is a genus of long-horned beetles in the family Cerambycidae. There are at least two described species in Ulochaetes.

Species
These two species belong to the genus Ulochaetes:
 Ulochaetes leoninus LeConte, 1854 i c g b (lion beetle)
 Ulochaetes vacca Holzschuh, 1982 c g
Data sources: i = ITIS, c = Catalogue of Life, g = GBIF, b = Bugguide.net

References

Necydalinae
Cerambycidae genera